Frankenstein Created Woman is a 1967 British Hammer horror film directed by Terence Fisher. It stars Peter Cushing as Baron Frankenstein and Susan Denberg as his new creation. It is the fourth film in Hammer's Frankenstein series.

Where Hammer's previous Frankenstein films were concerned with the physical aspects of the Baron's work, the interest here is in the metaphysical dimensions of life, such as the soul's relationship to the body.

Plot
Years after witnessing his father being executed by guillotine, Hans is working as an assistant to the failed Doctor Victor Frankenstein. Frankenstein, with the help of Dr. Hertz, is in the process of discovering a way of trapping the soul of a recently deceased person. Frankenstein believes he can transfer that soul into another recently deceased body to restore it to life.

Hans is also the lover of Christina, daughter of cowardly innkeeper Kleve. Christina's entire left side is disfigured and partly paralysed. Young dandies Anton, Johann and Karl frequent Kleve's inn and cause a disturbance. Johann threatens to have his father revoke Kleve's license if he complains. The three insist that they be served by Christina and mock her for her deformities. The taunting angers Hans, who fights the three of them and cuts Anton's face with a knife. Instead of helping Hans against the thugs, Kleve runs away and fetches the police.

Eventually, the dandies decide to leave the inn. They return in the night to steal wine from the inn and when Kleve catches them in the act, they beat him to death.

Meanwhile, Hans spends the night with Christina, and in the morning sees her leave on the stagecoach. Returning to town, Hans sees a crowd outside Kleve's tavern and, based on no evidence, is immediately presumed a suspect in the murder. Hans is arrested. He will not reveal his time with Christina as an alibi and, known for his short temper, is tried. The trial is a farce and Hans is convicted. Despite Frankenstein and Hertz's defenses against the accusations, Hans is executed by guillotine. Seeing this as an opportunity, Frankenstein gets hold of Hans' fresh corpse and traps his soul.

Distraught over Hans's death, Christina drowns herself in the river. The peasants fish out her body and bring it to Hertz to see if he can do anything. Frankenstein and Hertz transfer Hans' soul into her body. Over months of complex and intensive treatment, they cure her physical deformities. The result is a physically healthy woman with no memory of her past life. Frankenstein insists on telling her nothing but her name and keeping her in Hertz's house. Despite coming to her senses regarding her identity, Christina is taken over by the spirit of the vengeful Hans.

Christina kills Anton and Karl, driven mostly by the ghostly insistence of Hans. Frankenstein and Hertz become suspicious of her behaviour and take her to the guillotine where Hans and his father were executed. However, they believe she subconsciously retains the memories of Hans' father's death rather than of Hans himself. By the time Frankenstein realises the truth, he finds her already murdering Johann. Despite Frankenstein's pleas, Christina knows she now has no one and nothing left to live for and drowns herself again. Frankenstein, disappointed and having apparently learned a lesson, walks away silently.

Cast

Production
Frankenstein Created Woman was originally mooted as a follow-up to The Revenge of Frankenstein during its production in 1958, at a time when Roger Vadim's Et Dieu créa la femme (And God Created Woman) was successful (in fact, the film's original working title was And Then Frankenstein Created Woman). The film finally went into production at Bray Studios on 4 July 1966. It was Hammer's penultimate production there.

Critical reaction
Variety wrote that the film has "the excellent technical aspects which have come to be expected of the Hammer Film people," but that the script "often seems overly influenced by other and better-written screen efforts." The Monthly Film Bulletin expressed disappointment that the film did not focus on Frankenstein's work, but that the script was rather "more concerned with the gory murder spree which follows in the wake of Christina's restoration," concluding that "the poverty of the script is little compensation for the loss of the old tradition." Leonard Maltin is blunt: "everything goes wrong, including script." Halliwell's Film and Video Guide describes this film as a crude and gory farrago" while the Time Out Film Guide says it is "full of cloying Keatsian imagery which somehow transcends the more idiotic aspects of the plot."

Some commentators on Frankenstein Created Woman have been more positive. Martin Scorsese picked the movie as part of a 1987 National Film Theatre season of his favourite films, saying "If I single this one out it's because here they actually isolate the soul... The implied metaphysics are close to something sublime."

Box office
According to the records of the Fox studio, the double feature of this film and The Mummy’s Shroud needed to earn $1,625,000 in rentals to break even and made $1,590,000, meaning it made a loss.‘

Home media
Frankenstein Created Woman was released in October 2013 in the U.K. and on 28 January in the U.S. Each disc featured a restored version of the film, the episodes of "World of Hammer" episodes included on the DVD released by Anchor Bay over a decade before. Among the highlights is an audio commentary with actors Robert Morris and Derek Fowlds, moderated by Hammer expert Jonathan Rigby.

See also
 Frankenstein in popular culture
 List of films featuring Frankenstein's monster

Selected reading

References

External links

 
 
 Frankenstein Created Woman A review and analysis of the Hammer Studios film

1967 films
1967 horror films
1960s science fiction horror films
British science fiction horror films
Frankenstein films
Hammer Film Productions horror films
Films directed by Terence Fisher
Films scored by James Bernard
Films set in Europe
20th Century Fox films
1960s English-language films
1960s British films